Hyde Park is an affluent inner-southern suburb of Adelaide in the City of Unley.

It features King William Road, a popular shopping and dining destination in Adelaide. It is home to some of Adelaide's most expensive and luxurious properties. Millswood railway station and the Belair railway line are close to Hyde Park. Until the 1950s a tram line ran to Hyde Park.

Politically, the suburb is safe for the Liberal Party of Australia; at the 2010 election, it attracted 62.33% of the primary vote.

Population
In the 2021 Census, there were 1,660 people in Hyde Park. 72.6% of people were born in Australia and 81.1% of people spoke only English at home. The most common responses for religion were No Religion 43.7%, Catholic 19.5% and Anglican 11.8%.

See also
Hyde Park (disambiguation)

References

Suburbs of Adelaide